Mihai Viteazul National College may refer to one of five educational institutions in Romania:

Mihai Viteazul National College (Bucharest)
Mihai Viteazul National College (Ploiești), in Ploiești, Romania
Mihai Viteazul National College (Sfântu Gheorghe)
Mihai Viteazul National College (Slobozia)
Mihai Viteazul National College (Turda)